Events in the year 1858 in Iceland.

Incumbents 

 Monarch: Frederick VII of Denmark
 Council President of Denmark: Carl Christian Hall

Events 

 German historian Konrad von Maurer visited Iceland.

Births 

 29 May − Finnur Jónsson, philologist.
 Þorsteinn Erlingsson, poet.

References 

 
1850s in Iceland
Years of the 19th century in Iceland
Iceland
Iceland